New York Goes to Hollywood is a reality VH1 series that consists of eight, 30-minute-episodes. It premiered on August 4, 2008. It is a spin-off of the I Love New York series, features Tiffany "New York" Pollard as she tries to find an acting job in Hollywood, California. In order to be an "established actress," Tiffany Pollard has to put her life aside to achieve her Hollywood goal by leaving her mother, Michelle Patterson, and George "Tailor Made" Weisgerber, whose proposal she refused. The show is available on iTunes and the first episode was made available free for a limited time. A follow-up/spin-off season, entitled New York Goes to Work, premiered May 4, 2009.

Cast
All cast members played themselves unless otherwise listed.

Stars
Lizza Monet Morales
Tiffany "New York" Pollard
Scott Sedita

Recurring cast members
Amyrh Harris
Amy Kelly
Dane Nielsen
Akihiro Kitamura
Kazu Nagahama
Michelle Rothschild-Patterson
George Weisgerber — "Tailor Made"

One-time appearances
Mark Cronin
Cris Abrego
Addison Witt
Zondra Wilson
Barry Jay
Zachary Christopher Fay
Dina Davis

Crew
Dave Miller — director
Cris Abrego — co-creator
Mark Cronin — co-creator

Episodes
Episode One "California Here I Come!"
First aired August 4, 2008

Tiffany "New York" Pollard holds interviews for personal assistants. She hires Harvard graduate and former Access Hollywood special correspondent Lizza Monet-Morales. After that, Lizza sets up a workout for Tiffany at a gym in Hollywood and hires someone to make a reel of her most famous moments set up. The guy who makes her reel was supposed to deliver her reel to her the next day so she would have it for her show later that afternoon. He does not end up delivering her reel until right before she goes on stage. She then does her performance and all of the talent scouts wait for her to come out. It takes her too long and they all leave. The episodes ends with her going home.

Episode Two "Actress vs. Celebrity"
First aired August 11, 2008

Tiffany needed a manager and Lizza found one. He sets up two auditions with major directors. At the first audition, she meets a woman named Kelly. After Tiffany tells her to stop talking, Kelly goes in and Tiffany has trouble with her script. She did not do well so she went to her next audition. At this audition, she saw Kelly again. In the audition, the director criticized her but she told her she did well. Later that day, the manager then recommended an acting school. She once again, saw Kelly and thinks she is a stalker. After, she does an acting game with a man named Vos and thought he was cute. Shortly after, Kelly told her she did decent. New York got mad and it broke out in an argument. The two had a meeting with the acting coach and both are then kicked out for the day.

Episode Three "Japanese Commercial Shoot"
First aired August 18, 2008

New York learns that you have to give a little to get a little when her new manager sets her up with a spec commercial for a Japanese energy drink. New York and her assistant do a little research into their idea of "Japanese culture." New York completes the spec commercial after having the director blow up at his assistant for not cutting the wooden board so that when New York hit the object it would "chop" in half.

Episode Four "At Home With New York"
First aired August 25, 2008

New York's assistant is late...again! Slightly perturbed, New York takes a call from her manager regarding an In Touch photo shoot that he set up at her house. The anxiety over the photo shoot is compounded when New York receives the call that her mother is coming out to visit. When New York's mother (aka sister P.) arrives, she terrorizes New York's assistant, and the photo shoot is put in jeopardy by the domineering stage mother. Later, Sister P. demands a meeting with this new Hollywood manager and when Sister P. drags religion into the meeting and insults a prospective movie producer, New York starts to consider whether having her mother around is an asset to her career or a "bump in the road" on her path to acting stardom.
Episode Five "And She Sings??"
First aired September 1, 2008

It's a brand new day for New York but Sister P is still an ominous presence hovering over her career. New York is awakened by a phone call from her manager, who makes New York aware that today she is doing back up vocals for an R&B group and lessons with a vocal coach, stressing the importance of a celebrity to have cross-over ability. New York's assistant calls in sick, there's a cab ride from hell to the lesson, and New York has to perform weird vocal exercises. Later, Sister P has an altercation with the recording artists who turn out to be Little Jackie, which threatens to destroy New York's cross-over career before it even has a chance to begin. New York is forced to make a decision on the role her mother is plays in her acting career by sending her home.

Episode Six "Talk Show Appearance"
First aired September 8, 2008

The past comes back to haunt New York as she starts her day with a phone call in an attempt to salvage a past romantic relationship and the conversation has a seemingly nasty finality when she calls Tailor Made. New York's manager calls with the intent of putting her on the Chelsea Lately show. Anxiety grows, as New York dreads the questions that Chelsea Handler will ask. Later, New York's acting coach drops a bomb on New York, revealing an impending Shakespeare showcase and romance threatens to cloud her priorities as New York and her acting partner attempt to rehearse in an all too romantic setting. Finally, a surprise visit from Tailor Made further tests New York's ability to focus on her acting career and keep it from derailing.

Episode Seven "Romeo and Juliet...and..."
First aired September 15, 2008

New York's surprise visitor adds fuel to the fury that is New York, threatening to drag her away from her career path as Tiffany the aspiring actress. After an explosive argument at her house, in front of her new acting partner Vos, New York is put to the test on whether she can muster up the professionalism to deliver a solid performance in the Romeo and Juliet showcase. She now understands the fact that her ex flame, Tailor Made, has burned out. Her relationship with Tailor Made is over, and her relationship with her new acting partner has begun. Also, New York has to make a decision on whether to close another chapter that is the New York of the past or threaten the dream that Tiffany the actress has built.

Episode Eight "The Finale"
First aired September 22, 2008

New York has an audition for a film, but must give up reality television if she gets the role. At the same time, Cris Abrego and Mark Cronin offer her a new season of I Love New York. New York auditions for the film role after practicing with Vos and gets the part. She turns down I Love New York 3, but says if the acting career doesn't work out, she'll come back to reality TV (I Love New York 3) but if it does there will be a New York Goes to Hollywood: Season 2.

Critical reception
In a negative review of the show, Common Sense Media's Kari Croop criticized what she felt was an "awkwardly scripted approach to 'reality,'" also calling New York's acting abilities "questionable."

References

External links
View full cast list on IMDb

2000s American reality television series
2008 American television series debuts
2008 American television series endings
American television spin-offs
VH1 original programming
American dating and relationship reality television series
Flavor of Love spinoffs
English-language television shows
Television shows set in Los Angeles